CBEC may refer to:

 Central Board of Excise and Customs
 Casterton Business and Enterprise College
 CBEC-FM  a re-broadcaster of CBCS-FM
 Cranbourne Business and Enterprise College
 Columbia Basin Electric Co-op, a power provider in Northeastern Oregon